Dress blues may refer to:

Uniforms of the British Army#No.1: Temperate ceremonial, British Army dress uniform
Uniforms of the Royal Marines#Number 1A Regimental Blues Dress - 'Blues'
Army Service Uniform#Army Blue Service Uniform, of the United States Army
Uniforms of the United States Marine Corps#Blue Dress
Uniforms of the United States Navy#Service dress
Uniforms of the United States Coast Guard#Dress uniforms
"Dress Blues" (song), song by Jason Isbell from his 2007 album Sirens of the Ditch